Sean Scott may refer to:

 Sean Scott (American football), American football player
 Sean Scott (volleyball), American beach volleyball player
 Sean F. Scott, American disease activist and former ALS Therapy Development Institute president

See also 
 Seann William Scott, American actor